Altegris is an alternative investment firm headquartered in San Diego.

History
Based in San Diego, CA, Altegris was founded in 2002, by Jon Sundt, Matt Osborne, Robert Amedeo and Richard Pfister and is currently led by Marty Beaulieu, who serves as Chairman and Chief Executive Officer.

Acquisition
Altegris was acquired by Genworth Financial in 2010.

Genworth sold its stake, and the Altegris group was acquired in 2013 by private equity firms Aquiline Capital Partners LLC and Genstar Capital.

In 2018, Altegris merged with Artivest. On September 9, 2020, Altegris announced that it had regained control of its assets from Artivest, and was rebranding as an independent company.

References

External links
Company home page

Financial services companies established in 2002
2002 establishments in California
Alternative investment management companies
Companies based in San Diego
Investment companies of the United States